The Manchester School is an economics journal, edited since 1932 by the School of Social Science at the University of Manchester in Manchester, England.  It is currently published by John Wiley & Sons.

Every volume of The Manchester School incorporates five regular issues, one special issue devoted to a particular theme and a further special supplement containing selected papers from the Money, Macroeconomics and Finance Research Group Conference.

External links
 The Manchester School homepage
 The Manchester School at John Wiley & Sons
 The Money Macro and Finance Research Group (MMFRG) at the University of Essex

University of Manchester
Economics journals
Wiley-Blackwell academic journals
English-language journals